No Man's Land (Italian: Terra di nessuno) is a 1939 Italian drama film directed by Mario Baffico and starring Mario Ferrari, Nelly Corradi and Laura Solari. It is based on two novels by Luigi Pirandello.

The film's sets were designed by the art director Alberto Tavazzi. It was shot at the Cinecittà Studios in Rome. Location filming took place at Todi near Perugia.

Cast

References

Bibliography 
 Nina DaVinci Nichols. Pirandello and Film. University of Nebraska Press, 1995.

External links 
 

1939 films
Italian drama films
Italian black-and-white films
1939 drama films
1930s Italian-language films
Films directed by Mario Baffico
Films shot at Cinecittà Studios
1939 comedy films
Films based on works by Luigi Pirandello
1930s Italian films